Bacillus fastidiosus is an aerobic, motile, rod-shaped bacterium that has been isolated from soil and poultry litter. The species was first isolated and described by the scientist Den Dooren de Jong in 1929. This organism is a mesophile that contains ellipsoidal spores that do not cause swelling of the sporangia. Bacillus fastidiosus is only able to grow in the presence of uric acid, allantoin, or allantoic acid.

This species has been recently transferred into the genus Metabacillus. The correct nomenclature is Metabacillus fastidiosus.

Morphology
Bacillus fastidiosus has peritrichous flagella meaning that it has flagella in a uniform distribution all over the cell that it uses for motility. Cells of this species are about 5 µm long and 1.5 µm wide. They may contain endospores that can be located centrally, paracentrally, or subterminally. This bacterium is typically grown on 1% uric acid agar and colonies can have a rhizoid appearance. Colonies are typically opaque and may become yellowish over time. The cells will produce ammonia as a byproduct of their metabolism, which means that their microenvironment will become highly alkaline. This creates a self-limiting cycle that creates zones of inhibition around each colony. B. fastidiosus is catalase and oxidase positive. It is unable to produce acid or gas when grown in the presence of carbohydrates such as glucose. B. fastidiosus is able to hydrolyze urea, but it is unable to hydrolyze casein, gelatin, or starch.

Metabolism
Bacillus fastidious has the ability to use uricase to degrade uric acid to allantoin, and then use allantoinase to degrade allantoin to allantoate. It also has the ability to further break down allantoate to ammonia and ureidoglycolate via the enzyme allantoate amidohydrolase. The liberation of ammonia causes its local environment to rise to a pH between 8 and 9. However, attempts to grow Bacillus fastidious at those higher pH's without urea present were unsuccessful. It is able to metabolize ureidoglycolate further into urea and glyoxylate using the enzyme ureidoglycolase. Bacillus fastidious is also able to use urease to degrade urea.

References

External links
Type strain of Bacillus fastidiosus at BacDive -  the Bacterial Diversity Metadatabase

fastidiosus